Pietricica may refer to:

 Pietricica, a village in Lapoș Commune, Prahova County, Romania
 Pietricica River, a tributary of the Ialomicioara River in Romania

See also 
 Piatra (disambiguation)
 Pietriș (disambiguation)
 Pietreni (disambiguation)
 Pietrari (disambiguation)
 Pietrosu (disambiguation)
 Pietrișu (disambiguation)
 Pietroasa (disambiguation)
 Pietroșani (disambiguation)